Brian Keith Tanner  CPhys, FRSA, FInstP, FHEA is a British physicist, currently Emeritus Professor of Physics and former Dean of Knowledge Transfer at Durham University.

Early life 
Brian Tanner grew up in Northamptonshire, attending Wellingborough Grammar School. He studied undergraduate physics at Balliol College, University of Oxford, where he went on to graduate with a DPhil in 1971 on 'X-ray diffraction topography; methods and applications'.

Career 
Tanner is best known for research and business applications of X-ray diffraction topography.
Tanner has worked at the Department of Physics at Durham University since 1973, where he was made Professor of Physics in 1996 and was the University Dean of Knowledge Transfer from 2008–2016. He has published over 375 papers in international peer-reviewed journals and 4 books.
In 1978 he co-founded Bede Scientific Instruments Ltd, since 2008 owned by Jordan Valley Semiconductors.

Professor Tanner was the first Director of the North East Centre for Science Enterprise, serves as chief scientific advisor of the North East Technology Park (Netpark) and now chairs the County Durham Economic Partnership.

Awards and honours 
Tanner is a Chartered Physicist, a Fellow of the Institute of Physics, Fellow of the Higher Education Academy, and Fellow of the Royal Society of Arts
Jointly awarded the 2005 Barrett Award of the International Center for Diffraction Data. Awarded the Queen's Award for Enterprise Promotion in 2012 for his work in promoting enterprise and business in the North East. In 2014 the Institute of Physics awarded Tanner the Gabor Medal for distinguished work in the application of physics in an industrial, commercial or business context.

Personal life 
Married to Ruth Tanner, formerly a Trustee and Deputy President of the Workers' Educational Association and currently secretary of the Cobweb Orchestra, about which she published a history in 2013. He has two sons: Rob is a teacher and Director of Cross-Curricular Learning at St Albans School  and Tom is a climate change academic at SOAS University of London.

References

Alumni of Linacre College, Oxford
English physicists
Fellows of the Institute of Physics
1947 births
Living people
Fellows of the Higher Education Academy